Weight is a measurement of the gravitational force acting on an object.

Weight  or The Weight may also refer to:

Mathematics
 Weight (graph theory) a number associated to an edge or to a vertex of a graph
 Weight (representation theory), a type of function
 Weight (strings), the number of times a letter occurs in a string
 Weight, an integer associated to each variable of a quasi-homogeneous polynomial
 Weight of a topological space; see base
 Weighting, making some data contribute to a result more than others
 Weight function
 Weighted mean and weighted average, the importance can vary on each piece of data
 Weighting filter

Science and technology
 Weight (unit), a former English unit
 Weight, a connection strength, or coefficient in a linear combination, as in an artificial neural network
 Weight, a measure of paper density
 Body weight, a commonly used term for the mass of an organism's body
 Font weight
 Line weight in contour line construction in cartography
 Specific weight, the weight per unit volume of a material
 In underwater diving, a dense object used for ballast in a diving weighting system
 Balance weights, part of a weighing scale

Film and television
 The Weight (film), a 2012 South Korean film
 "Weight" (Justified), a 2014 television episode
 "The Weight" (The Sopranos), a 2002 television episode

Music
 Weight (album), by Rollins Band, 1994
 Weight (EP), by the Kindred, 2017
 "Weight" (song), by Latrice Royale, 2014
 "The Weight", a song by The Band, 1968
 "Weight", a song by Alexz Johnson, 2020
 "Weight", a song by Brockhampton from Iridescence, 2018
 "Weight", a song by Isis from Oceanic, 2002

Sports
 Weight, an object of known mass used in weight training
 Weight, the object thrown in a weight throw
 Draw weight of a bow
 Weight class, a competition division used to match competitors against others of their own size

Other uses
 Weight (surname)
 Weight (wine) or "body", a quality of wine

vi:Tương tác hấp dẫn#Trọng lực